Daima Mayelis Beltrán Guisado (born September 10, 1972) is a Cuban judoka. At the 2000 Summer Olympics she won the silver medal in the women's Heavyweight (+78 kg) category. She repeated that feat four years later in Athens, Greece.

She is currently training the Mexican Judo women's team at the CONADE facilities. Her most outstanding judokas to date have been Vanessa Zamboti and Edna Carrillo, who have participated in some editions of the Olympic Games.

References

External links
 
 
 

1972 births
Living people
Judoka at the 2000 Summer Olympics
Judoka at the 2004 Summer Olympics
Judoka at the 1995 Pan American Games
Judoka at the 1999 Pan American Games
Judoka at the 2003 Pan American Games
Olympic judoka of Cuba
Olympic silver medalists for Cuba
Olympic medalists in judo
Medalists at the 2004 Summer Olympics
Cuban female judoka
Medalists at the 2000 Summer Olympics
Pan American Games gold medalists for Cuba
Pan American Games medalists in judo
Universiade medalists in judo
Universiade bronze medalists for Cuba
Medalists at the 1999 Summer Universiade
Medalists at the 1999 Pan American Games
Medalists at the 2003 Pan American Games
20th-century Cuban women
20th-century Cuban people
21st-century Cuban women